Rose Pauline Peltesohn (16 May 1913 – 21 March 1998) was an Israeli mathematician of German origin.

Life
Rose Peltesohn was the daughter of the physician Ludwig Peltesohn (1882–1937) and of Cilly Caro. After graduation (Abitur) in March 1931 she studied mathematics and physics at the University of Berlin and got her Ph.D. in Mathematics at 1936 with  Issai Schur as supervisor (Das Turnierproblem für Spiele zu je dreien, The tournament problem for three person games). Her dissertation was valued opus valde laudabile(de). Being Jewish she emigrated through Italy to Palestine, arriving 1938. Between the years 1939–1942 she worked in a bank and later as a lawyer's secretary and translator in Tel Aviv. She married her cousin Gerhard Peltesohn, a lawyer (1909–1965), and they had two daughters, Ruth (born 1940) and Judith (born 1943).

Solution of Heffter's Difference Problems
A Difference Triple (a, b, c) is defined as three different elements from the set , whose sum  equals zero or for which one element  equals the sum of the other two.
First Difference Problem of Heffter: Let . Is there a partition of the set  in difference triples?
Second Difference Problem of Heffter: Let . Is there a partition of the set  in difference triples ?

Following Peltesohn, such a partition exists with the exception of the case v = 9.

The solution of the Difference Problem of Heffter also gives a construction of cyclic Steiner triple systems.

Literature
 in particular pages 188–189

External links
Short Biography at DMV site by Renate Tobies

References

20th-century German mathematicians
1913 births
1998 deaths
Jewish emigrants from Nazi Germany to Mandatory Palestine
20th-century Israeli mathematicians
20th-century women mathematicians